R v Smith, [1987] 1 S.C.R. 1045 is a leading Supreme Court of Canada decision. The Court struck down a mandatory seven-year sentence requirement for the importation of drugs as a violation of the right against cruel and unusual punishment contrary to section 12 of the Canadian Charter of Rights and Freedoms.

Background
Edward Smith, a twenty-seven-year-old man with multiple convictions for drug-related offences, was arriving back in Canada from Bolivia. At customs he was searched and the officers found over seven ounces of cocaine. He was convicted of importing drugs under the Narcotics Control Act and sentenced to eight years. The Act had required a minimum sentence of seven years regardless of the amount found. The provision was challenged on the basis that it violated the Charter.

The issue before the Supreme Court of Canada was whether the mandatory minimum sentence of seven years under section 5(2) of the Narcotics Control Act infringe section 7, 9, and 12 of the Charter.

Opinion of the Court
Justice Lamer, writing for the majority, held that the sentencing provision violated section 12 of the Charter. He noted that when it came to mandatory sentencing it is very important that deference be given except where it is grossly disproportionate. To assess the provision the court should consider both the gravity of the offence, the particular facts of the case, as well as the offender's personal characteristics. The characteristics are particularly important. Lamer speculated that even a young person caught bringing a single joint across the border will be subject to the sentencing provision. This, said Lamer, would subject the first time offender to cruel and unusual punishment.

On applying the section 1 test to the violation, it was found that the provision was rationally connected to the pressing objective of deterring drugs importation, but it failed to be proportional. Thus, it was struck down.

Dissent
Justice McIntyre, on dissent, objected on a number of grounds. He did not like Lamer's speculation of the first time offender. Smith was a multiple offender and had imported enough narcotics that it was not cruel and unusual to sentence him for over seven years. The standard for cruel and unusual punishment should be based on public outrage and the degradation of the offenders dignity, none of which was found.

See also
 List of Supreme Court of Canada cases (Dickson Court)

External links
 
 case summary from mapleleafweb.com

Canadian criminal case law
Canadian Charter of Rights and Freedoms case law
Supreme Court of Canada cases
1987 in Canadian case law